Grahame Hall (15 August 1919 – 5 March 1982) was an  Australian rules footballer who played with South Melbourne in the Victorian Football League (VFL).

Notes

External links 

1919 births
1982 deaths
Australian rules footballers from Victoria (Australia)
Sydney Swans players